Buffalo Soldiers is a 1997 American Western television film directed by Charles Haid and starring an ensemble cast including Lamont Bentley, Tom Bower, Timothy Busfield, Gabriel Casseus, Danny Glover, Bob Gunton, Keith Jefferson, Robert Knott, Carl Lumbly, Clifton Powell, Matt Ross, Glynn Turman, Michael Warren, and Mykelti Williamson. Set in 1880, the film tells the true story of the black cavalry corps known as the Buffalo Soldiers, who protected the Western territories after the end of the Civil War.

Buffalo Soldiers premiered on TNT on December 7, 1997. The film received three nominations at the 50th Primetime Creative Arts Emmy Awards.

Awards and nominations

References

External links
 

1997 television films
1997 films
1990s historical drama films
African-American drama films
African-American Western (genre) films
American Civil War films
American Indian Wars films
American films based on actual events
American historical drama films
American drama television films
Films about American slavery
Films about racism in the United States
Films directed by Charles Haid
Films scored by Joel McNeely
Films set in 1880
Films set in New Mexico
Historical television films
TNT Network original films
Television films based on actual events
American Western (genre) television films
1990s English-language films
1990s American films